Ute Lake State Park is a state park in New Mexico, USA, located on the eastern plains.

The park features a large  reservoir on the Canadian River that is home to various fish species including largemouth bass, catfish, crappie and walleye. The state-owned Ute Dam creating the reservoir was completed in 1963 without federal funding.

References

External links
 Ute Lake State Park

State parks of New Mexico
Parks in Quay County, New Mexico
Protected areas established in 1964